Hyannis (YTB-817) was a United States Navy named for Hyannis, Massachusetts.

Construction

The contract for Hyannis was awarded 9 August 1971. She was laid down on 12 July 1972 at Marinette, Wisconsin, by Marinette Marine and launched 15 March 1973.

Operational history

Stricken from the Navy List 21 August 1997, Hyannis was transferred to the United States Fish and Wildlife Service at Midway Atoll and renamed Constant II. In 2006, she was sold and renamed Sea-Link Pusher.

References

External links

 

Natick-class large harbor tugs
1973 ships